Uthangarai is a Taluk, Town Panchayat in Krishnagiri district in the Tamil Nadu state of India.

Demographics 
 India census,  Uthangarai had a total population of 15,393.

References

External links
 http://www.krishnagiri.tn.nic.in/
 http://www.tnmaps.tn.nic.in/pr_villages.php?dc=31&tlkname=Uthangarai&region=0006&lvl=taluk&size=1200

Cities and towns in Krishnagiri district